Valentine Colasante (born 5 March 1989) is a French ballet dancer. She is an étoile at the Paris Opera Ballet.

Biography
Colasante was born in Paris to a ballet teacher mother and jazz pianist father, both originally from  Italy. She entered the Paris Opera Ballet School in 1998 and entered the Paris Opera Ballet in 2006, at the age of 17. Colasante was promoted to Coryphée in 2010 and sujet the following year. She was named Première danseuse in 2013. Her first major role is Theme and Variations. She worked with Aurélie Dupont for that role.

In January 2018, Colasante danced the role of Kitri in Don Quixote with three days notice, and partnered with Karl Paquette. The show was Paquette's last Don Quixote. Following her performance, Dupont, now the artistic director, promoted Colasante to the rank of étoile on stage. She has danced classical productions, such as the title role in Cinderella and Myrtha in Giselle, as well as modern pieces such as Pina Bausch's Le Sacre du printemps and William Forsythe's In the Middle, Somewhat Elevated. Colasante was Paquette's partner when he bid farewell.

Selected repertoire
The Second Variation in La Bayadère
Brahms–Schoenberg Quartet
Bella Figura 
The title role in Cinderella
Concerto Barocco
Dances at a Gathering
Kitri in Don Quixote
Myrtha in Giselle
In Creases
In the Middle, Somewhat Elevated
"Rubies" from Jewels
Lescaut's Mistress in Manon
The title role in Raymonda
The Chosen One in Le Sacre du printemps
Odette/Odile, the Pas de trois and The Spanish Dance in Swan Lake
Effie in La Sylphide
Theme and Variations
Prudence in La Dame aux camélias

References

Paris Opera Ballet étoiles
Living people
1989 births
21st-century French ballet dancers
French ballerinas
Prima ballerinas
Dancers from Paris
French people of Italian descent